Albanchez de Mágina (formerly known Albanchez de Úbeda) is a city located in the province of Jaén, Spain. According to the 2006 census (INE), the city had a population of 1326 inhabitants.

See also
Pico Mágina

References

Municipalities in the Province of Jaén (Spain)